Zhaisan is a border crossing point between Kazakhstan and Russia. It is located in the Aktobe Region, southeast of Lake Zaysan.

The functioning of the border crossing is affected by the actions of the Russia Customs, Russian Border Control and some other Russia bureaus in Sagarchin.

Distances from Zhaisan

Orenburg: 154 km
Aktobe: 131 km

References

Kazakhstan–Russia border crossings
Populated places in Aktobe Region